The 1994 California State Controller election occurred on November 3, 1994. The primary elections took place on March 8, 1994. The Democratic nominee, Kathleen Connell, narrowly defeated the Republican nominee, ex-State Assemblyman Tom McClintock.

Primary results
Final results from California Secretary of State.

Democratic

Republican

Peace & Freedom

Others

Results
Final results from the Secretary of State of California.

Results by county
Final results from the Secretary of State of California.

See also
California state elections, 1994
State of California
Secretary of State of California

References

1994 California elections
California State Controller elections
November 1994 events in the United States
California